The "" ("National Anthem of Peru"; also known as "," or "National March of Peru"; "", or "We are free!") is the national anthem of Peru. It was composed by José Bernardo Alcedo, and its lyrics were written by José de la Torre Ugarte in 1821.

History

Public contest of 1821

After Peru declared its independence, the general José de San Martín began a public contest to select the National March, which was published on 7 August 1821 in the ministerial gazette. The contest called upon professors of poetry, composers and general aficionados, to send their signed productions to the Ministry of the State before 18 September, the day in which a designated commission would decide which of them would be adopted as the "National March".

Seven compositions were entered, and on a prefixed day, they were reviewed and played in the following order:
The band musician major from the "Numancia" Battalion
That of master José Bernardo Alcedo
That of master Guapaya
That of master Tena
That of master 
That of Father Aguilar, master of the Augustine Chapel
Another entry of master José Bernardo Alcedo, at the behest of a brother of the Convent of Saint Domingo

After hearing the last production of José Bernardo Alcedo, General José de San Martín stood up and exclaimed, "Without a doubt, this is the National Anthem of Peru." The following day, a signed decree confirmed this opinion expressed in the midst of great enthusiasm and jubilation. The anthem was first performed publicly in the night of 23 September 1821 in the Theater of Lima, in the presence of San Martín and the supporters of independence, who on that day were once more gathered in the capital. The voice of Rosa Merino, was the first to sing the lyrics to the anthem, from the original verses from the poet José de la Torre Ugarte from Ica. Upon hearing the music and the lyrics of the National Anthem for the first time, the audience responded with a standing ovation directed at Alcedo, who conducted the orchestra.

Arrangements and modifications
Diverse publications of the anthem had subtle modifications in the lyrics and the music, which was then restored by Claudio Rebagliati in 1869 at the behest of Alcedo. In 1874 there was a solicitation which asked for a revision to the lyrics of the anthem, in light of the various versions in circulation, as well as the minor mistakes which were found. This initiative was approved, but did not prosper, due to the rejection that it generated in the public opinion at its core and the recognition that it had already become a time honored tradition.

In 1901 there was another intent to reform the anthem, this time approved by the administration of Eduardo López de Romaña, who approved of the music of the restored anthem by Rebagliati. He declared a new contest to select new lyrics as he considered the original lyrics as aggressive towards Spain, which at the time had amiable relations with Peru. The winner of the contest was the poet José Santos Chocano, whose verses along with the same chorus went on to be sung in public schools and in public venues. The lyrics also had references to the great South American liberator hero Simón Bolívar as well as José de San Martín, the nation's founder, in the first verse.

It was not long until public opinion once again asked for the original lyrics to be restored. Public pressure was so great that the Peruvian Congress was obligated in 1913 during the administration of President Guillermo Billinghurst to declare untouchable the lyrics as well as the chorus of the National Anthem.

In 1954, at the behest of Raúl Porras Barrenechea, Chabuca Granda composed a new replacement for the first verse in the anthem, but this was never implemented:

The last attempts to change the anthem were first during the administration of General Juan Velasco Alvarado who attempted to change the second and third stanzas. In similar form to previous attempts, it was imposed during official ceremonies and in schools and during the administration of General President Francisco Morales Bermudez the last stanza was sung instead of the first. But these attempts also had no success and the original anthem was once again sung when his successor Fernando Belaunde Terry became President in 1980.

Officialization of the sung verse
The Constitutional Tribunal determined in June 2005 that the first stanza in the anthem (Largo tiempo...) was not written by José de la Torre Ugarte and that was just a popular folklore, but its insertion into the history of the anthem expressed the will of the people represented in Law N° 1801 passed by Congress which declares it an intangible subject. The Constitutional Tribunal also verified that the fifth stanza had been excluded in the original anthem and considering author's rights and the integrity of the piece, it was ordered that the fifth stanza be restored into the official anthem as the sixth stanza with a total of seven stanzas making up the official national anthem.

Starting September 2009, Verse 7 of the National Anthem, as sanctioned by the Peruvian Government, has become the official sung verse of the anthem instead of and replacing the first, with the verse starting to be included in schools from 2010 onward. The Peruvian Armed Forces and National Police of Peru also adopted the new official verse, with a new music video of the anthem made for this purpose at the same month as the adoption of the now official seventh verse of the national anthem.

The "stand at attention" posture is done when it is played for civilians while military, police and fire personnel must render hand salutes when out of formation. Some people do the "hand on heart" posture, following US practice. In ceremonies and concerts, the following shout is done when the anthem's performance is over:

 Leader: ¡Viva el Perú!/Kawsachun Piruw!/Ayaya Piruw!/Kimoshiretantsi Peru! (Long live Peru!)
 All: ¡Viva!/Kawsachun!/Ayaya!/Kimoshiretantsi! (Long live!)

The chant Long Live Peru! is also done in sporting events, concerts, anniversaries and other occasions after the playing of the national anthem.

Lyrics

Official lyrics
The official lyrics since 2009 consist of the chorus and seventh (originally sixth) verse of the full lyrics.

Full lyrics

Notes

References

External links
 Himno Nacional del Perú instrumental interpretado por el pianista Ward De Vleeschhouwer
 Peru: Himno Nacional del Peru – Audio of the national anthem of Peru, with information and lyrics (archive link)
 HXD – Peruvian Defence Ministry

Peru
Spanish-language songs
1821 songs
Peruvian music
National anthems
National anthem compositions in F major
National symbols of Peru